Gram-negative folliculitis occurs in patients who have had moderately inflammatory acne for long periods and have been treated with long-term antibiotics, mainly tetracyclines, a disease in which cultures of lesions usually reveals a species of Klebsiella, Escherichia coli, Enterobacter, or, from the deep cystic lesions, Proteus.

References

External links 

Acneiform eruptions
Bacterium-related cutaneous conditions